Anna Karenina is a novel by Leo Tolstoy.

Anna Karenina may also refer to:

Film
Anna Karenina (1911 film), a Russian short film
Anna Karenina (1914 film), a Russian drama film
Anna Karenina (1915 film), an American film starring Betty Nansen
Anna Karenina (1918 film), a Hungarian film starring Irén Varsányi
Anna Karenina (1920 film), a German silent historical film
Anna Karenina (1935 film), by Clarence Brown starring Greta Garbo and Fredric March
Anna Karenina (1948 film), by Julien Duvivier starring Vivien Leigh and Ralph Richardson
Anna Karenina (1953 film), a Soviet historical drama film
Anna Karenina (1967 film), a Russian film by Alexander Zarkhi
Anna Karenina (1975 film), a Russian film by Margarita Pilikhina
Anna Karenina (1997 film), an American film by Bernard Rose and starring Sophie Marceau and Sean Bean
Anna Karenina (soundtrack)
Anna Karenina (2012 film), a British film by Joe Wright and starring Keira Knightley, Jude Law, and Matthew Macfadyen
Anna Karenina: Vronsky's Story, a 2017 Russian film by Karen Shakhnazerov and starring Yelizaveta Boyarskaya and Maksim Matveyev

Television
Anna Karenina (1977 TV serial), a BBC serial
Anna Karenina (1985 film), a telefilm by Simon Langton starring Jacqueline Bisset and Christopher Reeve
Anna Karenina (1996 TV series), a Filipino television series
Anna Karenina (2000 TV series), a British series by David Blair
Anna KareNina (2013 TV series), a Philippine television drama based on the 1996 TV series

Stage
Anna Karenina (ballet), by Boris Eifman
Anna Karenina (musical), a 1992 musical by Peter Kellogg and Daniel Levine
Anna Karenina, a 1923 opera by Jenő Hubay
Anna Karenina (Carlson), a 2007 opera by David Carlson
Anna Karenina (Hamilton), a 1981 opera by Iain Hamilton

Other uses
MS Anna Karenina or MS Regina Baltica, a cruiseferry

See also
Anna Karina (1940–2019), Danish-French film actress, singer and writer
"Anna Karina" (song)